Alana M. DiMario (born September 23, 1978) is an American politician and mental health councilor serving as a member of the Rhode Island Senate from the 36th district. Elected in November 2020, she assumed office on January 5, 2021.

Education 
DiMario earned a Bachelor of Arts degree in psychology from Wells College and a Master of Science in clinical psychology from Bridgewater State University.

Career 
Outside of politics, DiMario works as a licensed mental health counselor in private practice. She was an unsuccessful candidate for the Rhode Island Senate in 2018. She ran again in 2020 and assumed office on January 5, 2021. DiMario also serves as vice chair of the Senate Environment and Agriculture Committee and co-chair of the Permanent Joint Legislative Commission on Child Care.

References 

Living people
1978 births
Democratic Party Rhode Island state senators
Wells College alumni
Bridgewater State University alumni
People from Narragansett, Rhode Island
American women psychologists